Mithapur B. L. High School is a secondary school located in Mithapur, Badalgachhi Upazila, Naogaon, Bangladesh. It was founded in 1941.

References

High schools in Bangladesh
1941 establishments in India
Educational institutions established in 1941